List of monastic houses in Scotland is a catalogue of the abbeys, priories, friaries and other monastic religious houses of Scotland.

In this article alien houses are included, as are smaller establishments such as cells and notable monastic granges (particularly those with resident monks). The numerous monastic hospitals per se are not included here unless at some time the foundation had, or was purported to have, the status or function of an abbey, priory, friary or preceptory/commandery.

The geographical co-ordinates provided are sourced from details provided by the Royal Commission on the Ancient and Historical Monuments in Scotland (RCAHMS) and Ordnance Survey publications.

Overview

Article layout 
The list is presented alphabetically by council area. Foundations are listed alphabetically within each area.

Communities/provenance: shows the status and communities existing at each establishment, together with such dates as having been established as well as the fate of the establishment after dissolution, and the current status of the site.

Formal name or dedication: shows the formal name of the establishment or the person in whose name the church is dedicated, where known.

Alternative names: some of the establishments have had alternative names over the course of time. In order to assist in text-searching, such alternatives in name or spelling have been provided.

Abbreviations and key

Locations with names in italics indicate probable duplication (misidentification with another location) or non-existent foundations (either erroneous reference or proposed foundation never implemented.

Communities/provenance: shows the status and communities existing at each establishment, together with such dates as having been established as well as the fate of the establishment after dissolution, and the current status of the site.

Formal name or dedication: shows the formal name of the establishment or the person in whose name the church is dedicated, where known.

Alternative names: some of the establishments have had alternative names over the course of time. In order to assist in text-searching, such alternatives in name or spelling have been provided.

List of establishments by county/region

Aberdeen

Aberdeenshire

Angus

The following location in Angus has no monastic connection:
Rossie Priory: mansion, built 1807

Return to top of page

Argyll & Bute

Return to top of page

Ayrshire

East Ayrshire

Return to top of page

North Ayrshire

Return to top of page

Ayrshire, North non-Christian monasteries

Return to top of page

South Ayrshire

Return to top of page

Dumfries and Galloway

Return to top of page

Dumfries and Galloway non-Christian monasteries

Return to top of page

Dunbartonshire

West Dunbartonshire

Return to top of page

City of Edinburgh

Return to top of page

Eilean Siar

Return to top of page

Fife

The following locations in the Fife Region have no monastic connection:
Crawford Priory: mansion, built 1813
Inchrye Abbey: mansion, built 19thC

Return to top of page

City of Glasgow

Return to top of page

Highland

Return to top of page

Lanarkshire

South Lanarkshire

Return to top of page

Lothian

East Lothian

Return to top of page

West Lothian

Return to top of page

Midlothian

Return to top of page

Moray

Return to top of page

Orkney

Return to top of page

Perth & Kinross

Return to top of page

Renfrewshire

Return to top of page

Scottish Borders

The following location in the Scottish Borders has no known monastic connection:
Abbey: placename probably does not pre-date 1726

Return to top of page

Stirling

The following location in the Stirling Region has no monastic connection:
Ross Priory: mansion named 'Ross', renamed 'Ross Priory' 1810

Return to top of page

Unidentified supposed foundations

Return to top of page

See also 
List of country houses in the United Kingdom
Hospitals in medieval Scotland

Notes

Footnotes

References 

 Thorold, Henry, Collins Guide to the Ruined Abbeys of England, Wales and Scotland, Collins, 1993
 Robinson, David, The Cistercian Abbeys of Britain, B. T. Batsford with English Heritage, CADW, Historic Scotland, 2002
 Cowan, Ian B. & Easson, David E. (1976) Medieval Religious Houses Scotland. Longman
 Butler, Rev. D., M.A. Scottish Cathedrals and Abbeys, The Guild Library, A&C Black, 1901
 Leicester Addis, M. E., Cathedrals and Abbeys of Presbyterian Scotland, Philadelphia, The Westminster Press, 1901
 Fawcett, R., Scottish Abbeys and Priories, Historic Scotland, 1994
 Scotland Churches Scheme, Churches to Visit in Scotland, 1999, Saint Andrew Press
 Coventry, M. and Miller, J., Churches and Abbeys of Scotland, Thistle Guide, Goblinshead, 2003
 Cruden, S., Scottish Abbeys, An Introduction to the mediæval Abbeys and Priories of Scotland, Her Majesty's Stationery Office, 1960
 Wright, Geoffrey N., (2004) Discovering Abbeys and Priories, Shire Publications Ltd.

Abbeys and priories in Scotland
Scotland
Scotland
Scotland